Pickmere is a village and civil parish near Knutsford in the Borough of Cheshire East. It has a population of 541.

Pickmere is home to one of the radio telescopes that make up the Jodrell Bank MERLIN (Multi-Element Radio Linked Interferometer Network) radio telescope array linking six observing stations that together form a powerful telescope with an effective aperture of over 217 kilometres.

See also

Listed buildings in Pickmere

References

External links

Villages in Cheshire